Charles Ashton (1848 – 13 October 1899) was a Welsh literary historian and bibliophile, born in Llawr-y-glyn, Montgomeryshire (Powys).

A police officer by profession, Ashton is chiefly remembered for his pioneering and thorough survey of 17th to 19th century Welsh literature, Hanes Llenyddiaeth Gymreig o 1651 hyd 1850, published in 1893. He also published a history of Dinas Mawddwy in 1892.

Ashton committed suicide after attacking his wife with a razor in 1899.

Works
Bywyd ac Amserau yr Esgob Morgan (1891)
Gweithiau Iolo Goch (1896)
Hanes Llenyddiaeth Gymreig 1650-1850 (1893)
Llyfryddiaeth y 19eg Ganrif (1908)

References

External links
Charles Ashton Letters and Newspaper Cuttings

19th-century Welsh writers
Welsh-language writers
1848 births
1899 deaths
1890s suicides